Joseph William (Willie) Comeau  (March 12, 1876 – January 11, 1966) was a Canadian educator and political figure in Nova Scotia, Canada. He represented Digby County in the Nova Scotia House of Assembly from 1907 to 1925 and from 1928 to 1948 as a Liberal member. Comeau sat for Clare division in the Senate of Canada from 1948 to 1966.

Early life and education
He was born in Comeauville, Nova Scotia, the son of Louis Comeau and Catherine Bourneuf, and was educated at the Collège Sainte-Anne.

Political career
Comeau served as a minister without portfolio in the province's Executive Council from 1911 to 1917, from 1921 to 1925 and from 1933 to 1948. He was a member of the Nova Scotia Legislative Council from 1925 to 1928. Comeau resigned his seat in the provincial assembly in 1917 to run unsuccessfully for a seat in the House of Commons.

Death
He died in office at the age of 89 in Yarmouth.

Personal life
Comeau was married twice: first to Grace Sheehan and then, after her death, to Zoé Doucet. His son, Benoit Comeau served as the MLA for Clare from 1967 to 1981 and his grandson Robert Thibault served in the House of Commons from 2000 to 2008.

See also 
 Nova Scotia Heritage Day

References 
 

1876 births
1966 deaths
Nova Scotia Liberal Party MLAs
Nova Scotia Liberal Party MLCs
Canadian senators from Nova Scotia
Acadian people
Liberal Party of Canada candidates for the Canadian House of Commons
Nova Scotia candidates for Member of Parliament
Liberal Party of Canada senators
Place of death missing